NGTS-3 is a star located in the southern constellation Columba. With an apparent magnitude of 14.67, it requires a powerful telescope to observe. However, NGTS-3 is actually an unresolved spectroscopic binary. The system is located 2,480 light years away based on parallax, but is drifting away with a radial velocity of 8.57 km/s.

Properties
The system contains two main sequence stars of classes G6 and K1 respectively; only the primary properties is known. NGTS-3A has a similar mass to the Sun, but is 7% smaller.

Planetary System
In 2018, the NGTS survey discovered an inflated hot Jupiter orbiting NGTS-3A despite the components being visually unresolved.

References

G-type main-sequence stars
Columba (constellation)